Nanaki may refer to:

 Red XIII, a character in the video game Final Fantasy VII
 Bebe Nanaki, sister of the Sikh Guru Nanak
 Mata Nanaki, wife of the Sikh Guru Hargobind